Harry Ernest "Dutch" Schirick (June 15, 1890 – November 12, 1968) was a pinch hitter in Major League Baseball for one game in 1914, who also later had a career as a New York Supreme Court judge for the Third District from 1935 to 1961.

Life
Schirick was born June 15, 1890 in Ruby, New York. He studied law at Cornell, where he was a member of the Quill and Dagger Society. He played the position of catcher and was captain of the baseball team. Hughie Jennings managed the Cornell baseball team and recommended Schirick to Branch Rickey, who signed him for the St. Louis Browns.

Schirick made one plate appearance, for the St. Louis Browns on September 17, 1914, as a pinch hitter. With the hometown Browns down 12-2 in the bottom of the ninth to the Washington Senators, Schirick walked for pitcher Allan Sothoron, who coincidentally was also making his major league debut in the game.

This made Schirick (whose records do not show him playing for any other pro team, even in the minors) one of only five MLB players with one distinction: he drew a walk in his only plate appearance and did not play in the field. (The most famous of these five: Eddie Gaedel.)  Schirick is also credited with stealing two bases, presumably second and third, since he is not credited with scoring a run; this makes him the only player in MLB history to play in only one game with two steals.  However, with the Senators up by 10 runs in the ninth, under modern scoring practices Schirick would have been credited with advancing to these bases via defensive indifference.

After one season, and one time at bat, Schirick declined an offer to go the minors, and decided to pursue a career in law. In 1921 he organized a semi-professional team, the Colonels, in Kingston, New York. Major league teams would, on occasion, play exhibition games against the Colonels.

Schirick was also involved in local politics and was Chairman of the Ulster County Democratic Party in 1927. In 1932, he was a New York delegate to the Democratic National Convention in Chicago. Schirick served as a New York Supreme Court judge for the Third District from 1935 to 1961.

Judge Harry Schirick died in Kingston, November 12, 1968 and is buried in Mount Marion Cemetery, Mount Marion, New York.

References

Sources
 Tiano, Charles J. “Tiano’s Topics”, Kingston Daily Freeman, 10 December 1968, p. 19.

External links

1890 births
1968 deaths
St. Louis Browns players
Baseball players from New York (state)